My Good Friend is a British television sitcom produced by Hartswood Films in association with Anglia Television for ITV, and it ran for two years between 4 April 1995 and 8 October 1996. It starred George Cole and Richard Pearson as widowed pensioner Peter Banks (Cole) and retired librarian Harry King (Pearson). The show ran for two series, each of seven episodes.

Synopsis
Peter Banks lives with his daughter Betty and son-in-law Brian but knows that his presence there is uncomfortable for all three.  He meets Harry King and Harry's landlady, a single mother called Ellie.  Gradually Peter, Harry and Ellie realise that they can fill the gaps in each other's lives and Peter moves into the spare room at Ellie's house.

Cast
 George Cole - Peter Banks
 Richard Pearson - Harry King
 Minnie Driver - Ellie (Series 1)
 Lesley Vickerage - Ellie (Series 2)
 Matilda Ziegler - Betty (Series 1)
 Annabelle Apsion - Betty (Series 2)
 Michael Lumsden - Brian

References
Notes

Sources
Mark Lewisohn, "Radio Times Guide to TV Comedy", BBC Worldwide Ltd, 2003

External links

1995 British television series debuts
1996 British television series endings
1990s British sitcoms
ITV sitcoms
English-language television shows
Television series by ITV Studios
Television shows produced by Anglia Television